Randy Sparks (born July 29, 1933, Leavenworth, Kansas) is an American musician, singer-songwriter and founder of The New Christy Minstrels and The Back Porch Majority.

Biography
Sparks grew up in Oakland, California and attended the University of California at Berkeley. His first musical engagement was at the Purple Onion in San Francisco. In the late 1950s during his solo career, he released two albums on the Verve label, a self-titled album in 1958 and Walking the Low Road in 1959. The single "Walkin' The Low Road" reached the Cashbox magazine Top 60.

In 1960, he formed a trio called "The Randy Sparks Three", and they released an album of the same name. He composed "Today"; this was a hit for the New Christy Minstrels from their 1964 album of the same title for Columbia Records (CL 2159/CS 8959). He co-composed Green, Green with Barry McGuire for the 1963 album Ramblin (CL 2055/CS 8855). Sparks starred in the 1960 film drama The Big Night.

Sparks also wrote "Saturday Night in Toledo, Ohio", which was recorded and made famous by John Denver.

Sparks also composed the musical score for the 1964 movie Advance to the Rear, a Civil War spoof. The love song "Today" ("while the blossoms still cling to the vine") was part of that score.

Sparks sang the theme song over the opening credits of the 1958 film Thunder Road. In an email to DJ Allyn in 2009, he said that Robert Mitchum had asked him to play the kid brother in the movie and to compose a theme song for it. But in the theatrical release, Sparks sang a different theme song which was co-written by Mitchum.

In 2009, a Golden Palm Star on the Palm Springs, California, Walk of Stars was dedicated to him and The New Christy Minstrels.

Personal life
He was married to Jackie Miller from 1958 to 1962. After their divorce, he was married to actress Diane Jergens from 1962 until her death in 2018. The couple had four children, Kevin Ray (born 1963), twins Cameron Michael and Melinda Anne (born 1966), and Amanda Hamilton who was born in 1970.

References

External links
 
 New Christy Minstrels website
 Randy Sparks discography at Discogs

American male singer-songwriters
American banjoists
American folk singers
American folk musicians
1933 births
Living people
People from Leavenworth, Kansas
The New Christy Minstrels members
The Back Porch Majority members
Singer-songwriters from Kansas